Šalgovce is a municipality in the Topoľčany District of the Nitra Region, Slovakia. In 2011 it had 503 inhabitants.

References

External links

Villages and municipalities in Topoľčany District